John I (c. 1201 – 10 March 1222) was the king of Sweden from 1216 until his death.

Background
John was the son of King Sverker II of Sweden of the House of Sverker and Queen Ingegerd of the Bjälbo dynasty. When he was one year old, his maternal grandfather Jarl Birger Brosa died. King Sverker appointed his son as nominal jarl in order to strengthen his own ruling powers and secure the increasingly important jarl institution. This enraged the rival House of Eric as well as some of Birger Brosa's offspring, and John was contemptuously known as the "breech-less jarl". John retained his dignity until his father King Sverker was beaten in the Battle of Lena in 1208, later to be killed in the Battle of Gestilren in 1210. His rival Erik Knutsson, from the House of Eric, became King Eric X of Sweden.

Reign

When King Eric X died suddenly in fever in 1216, the teen-aged John was hailed king by the Swedish aristocracy against the will of the Pope in Rome. The Danish King Valdemar Sejr also opposed the choice, since the posthumous son of Eric X was a nephew of his. In Sweden itself the succession did not take place without strife. The Church had a big stake in the appointment, and it is apparent that John had a number of church leaders at his side, including Archbishop Valerius, Bishop Bengt of Skara and Bishop Karl of Linköping. The last-mentioned was termed chancellor; this is the first time that the title occurs in Sweden. The young ruler was crowned in 1219 and immediately issued a charter of privileges to the Swedish bishops. The charter confirmed the privileges that his father Sverker II had issued i 1200, but expanded them. The properties of the church were to be free from royal revenue demands, and fines paid by tenants of the Church would go to the bishops. He also granted several royal farms to various clergymen.

King John remained on the throne until his death on 10 March 1222. He died unmarried and childless, and left a favourable memory in Swedish historiography: "He was young of years and very gentle. He was king for three winters and died of illness on Visingsö. All of Sweden deeply mourned his death, that he was not allowed a longer life. And he rests in Alvastra, and God may preserve his soul in eternity". In the same year 1222, the rival dynasty's young heir, Erik Eriksson ascended the throne at the age of 6 to reign as King Eric XI of Sweden.

Expedition to Estonia
During the brief reign of King John, a Swedish presence was established in Estonia. The background to this is the activities of the German Order of the Sword Brothers and the Danish King Valdemar Sejr in the still pagan Baltic region. The Swedish aristocracy wished to share the spoils, and an expedition was equipped. King John himself, his cousin, Jarl Karl Döve (the brother of Birger Brosa), and his chancellor, Bishop Karl Magnusson led the fleet to Rotalia in Estonia in 1220. The enterprise was initially successful and King John established a base in Leal (Lihula). From this stronghold the Swedish soldiers made forays to the countryside, built churches and forced the locals to accept baptism. The king then returned home. However, the expedition ended in disaster. The inhabitants of Ösel assaulted the Swedish base in the Battle of Lihula on 8 August 1220. Bishop Karl and Jarl Karl Döve fell together with almost all the Swedish defenders. The devastating defeat left no Swedish presence and discouraged the Swedish expansion to Estonia for more than 300 years. The events were described in the Chronicle of Henry of Livonia and the Livonian Rhymed Chronicle.

References

Literature
 Harrison, Dick, Jarlens sekel. En berättelse om 1200-talets Sverige. Stockholm: Ordfront, 2002.
 Tunberg, Sven, Sveriges historia till våra dagar. Andra delen: Äldre medeltiden. Stockholm: P.A. Norstedt & Söners Förlag, 1926.

External links

1201 births
1222 deaths
13th-century Swedish monarchs
Rulers of Finland
Christians of the Livonian Crusade
Swedish jarls
Sons of kings